Interpreting the Masters Volume 1: A Tribute to Daryl Hall and John Oates is the third studio album by American indie pop duo The Bird and the Bee. It was released on March 23, 2010 by Blue Note Records and is a tribute album to Hall & Oates.

The album includes eight classic Daryl Hall and John Oates covers, along with the original song "Heard It on the Radio". Shirley Manson of the alternative rock band Garbage performs backing vocals during the chorus of their cover of the 1982 Billboard Hot 100 number-one single "Maneater".

Track listing

Personnel
Credits for Interpreting the Masters Volume 1: A Tribute to Daryl Hall and John Oates adapted from liner notes.

The Bird and the Bee
 Greg Kurstin – bass, drums, engineer, keyboards, mixing, producer, programming (all tracks); guitar (6)
 Inara George – vocals

Additional personnel
 Shanieka Brooks – product manager
 Antwon Jackson – A&R administration
 Gordon H. Jee – creative director
 Carla Leighton – art direction, design
 Gavin Lurssen – mastering
 Shirley Manson – backing vocals (6)
 Cydney Puro – photography
 Watchdog Management – management
 Eli Wolf – A&R

Charts

References

2010 albums
Albums produced by Greg Kurstin
The Bird and the Bee albums
Blue Note Records albums
Tribute albums
Hall & Oates